Ariel Germiniani (born October 20, 1990) is a Brazilian soccer player currently playing for Miami FC in the USSF Division 2 Professional League.

Career
Ariel signed for Miami FC in 2010 after playing for Desportivo Brasil and for one of Miami FC's sister clubs, Estoril, of Liga Vitalis in Portugal.

He made his debut for Miami on May 15, 2010, in a game against NSC Minnesota Stars, and scored his first goal for the team on June 9, 2010, in a game against Crystal Palace Baltimore, before being released by the team mid-season, having made just eight first-team appearances.

References

External links 
 Miami bio

1990 births
Living people
Brazilian footballers
Miami FC (2006) players
USSF Division 2 Professional League players
Desportivo Brasil players
G.D. Estoril Praia players
People from Ouro Fino
Association football midfielders
Sportspeople from Minas Gerais